Carnivoramorpha ("carnivoran-like forms") is a clade of placental mammals that includes the modern order Carnivora and its extinct stem-relatives.

Classification and phylogeny

Traditional classification
 Clade: Carnivoramorpha  [Carnivora + all basal clades to Carnivora, but without Creodonts]
 Order: Carnivora  (carnivorans)
 Suborder: Caniformia  ("dog-like" carnivorans)
 Suborder: Feliformia  ("cat-like" carnivorans)
 Incertae sedis:
 Genus: †Palaeogale 
 Superfamily: †Miacoidea 
 Family: †Miacidae 
 Family: †Viverravidae 
 Incertae sedis:
 †"Sinopa" insectivorus 
 Incertae sedis:
 Genus: †Ravenictis 
 †Carnivoramorpha sp. (UALVP 31176)

Revised classification
Recent phylogenetic studies indicate that the superfamily Miacoidea and family Miacidae are paraphyletic, with "miacids" being more closely related to carnivorans than to viverravids. In 2010 Flynn, Finarelli & Spaulding named a new clade Carnivoraformes within Carnivoramorpha, containing carnivorans and "miacids" but not viverravids. The authors defined Carnivoraformes as the clade containing Carnivora and all taxa that are more closely related to Carnivora (represented by Canis lupus) than to viverravids (represented by Viverravus gracilis).
 Clade: Carnivoramorpha 
 Clade: Carnivoraformes 
 Genus: †Africtis 
 Genus: †Dawsonicyon 
 Genus: †Miacis 
 (unranked): Clade "B"
 Family: †Quercygalidae 
 (unranked): †Gracilocyon/Oodectes clade
 Genus: †Eogale 
 Genus: †Gracilocyon (paraphyletic genus) 
 Genus: †Oodectes (paraphyletic genus) 
 Genus: †Paramiacis 
 Genus: †Paroodectes 
 Incertae sedis:
 †"Miacis" sp. [CM 67873 & CM 77299] 
 Genus: †Messelogale 
 Genus: †Miocyon 
 Genus: †Simamphicyon 
 Genus: †Uintacyon (paraphyletic genus) 
 Genus: †Xinyuictis 
 Genus: †Zodiocyon 
 (unranked): Clade "C"
 Genus: †Dormaalocyon 
 (unranked): †Vulpavus clade
 Genus: †Palaearctonyx 
 Genus: †Vassacyon 
 Genus: †Vulpavus (paraphyletic genus) 
 Incertae sedis:
 †"Miacis" deutschi 
 †"Miacis" exiguus 
 (unranked): Clade "D"
 Order: Carnivora  (carnivorans)
 Genus: †Ceruttia 
 Genus: †Harpalodon 
 Genus: †Lycarion 
 Genus: †Neovulpavus 
 Genus: †Procynodictis 
 Genus: †Prodaphaenus 
 Genus: †Tapocyon 
 Genus: †Walshius 
 Incertae sedis:
 †"Miacis" gracilis 
 †"Miacis" hargeri 
 †"Miacis" invictus 
 †"Miacis" lushiensis 
 Incertae sedis:
 †"Miacis" boqinghensis 
 †"Miacis" hookwayi 
 †"Miacis" latidens 
 †"Miacis" petilus 
 †Carnivoraformes undet. Genus A 
 †Carnivoraformes undet. Genus B 
 ichnotaxa of Carnivoraformes:
 Ichnogenus: †Falcatipes 
 Superfamily: †Viverravoidea 
 Family: †Viverravidae 
 Incertae sedis:
 Genus: †Ravenictis 
 †"Sinopa" insectivorus 
 †Carnivoramorpha sp. [UALVP 31176] 
 †Carnivoramorpha sp. [UALVP 50993 & UALVP 50994] 
 †Carnivoramorpha sp. [USNM 538395]

Phylogenetic tree
The phylogenetic relationships of Carnivoramorpha are shown in the following cladogram:

See also
 Mammal classification
 Ferae
 Miacoidea

References

Further reading

 C. M. Janis, J. A. Baskin, A. Berta, J. J. Flynn, G. F. Gunnell, R. M. Hunt jr., L. D. Martin, and K. Munthe (1998.) "Carnivorous mammals." In C. M. Janis, K. M. Scott, and L. L. Jacobs (eds.) "Evolution of Tertiary Mammals of North America. Volume 1: Terrestrial Carnivores, Ungulates, and Ungulatelike Mammals." Cambridge University Press, Cambridge. 
 K. D. Rose and J. D. Archibold (2005) "The Rise of Placental Mammals: Origins and Relationships of the Major Extant Clades", Baltimore and London, Johns Hopkins University Press 
 K. D. Rose and J. D. Archibold (2005) "Womb with a View: the Rise of Placentals." In: K. D. Rose and J. D. Archibold "The Rise of Placental Mammals: Origins and Relationships of the Major Extant Clades", Baltimore and London, Johns Hopkins University Press 
 
 Stiles, David P. (2005) investigation of the Vulpes and Urocyon phylogenetic classification: Feliformia or Caniformia?” Fox Phylogeny. Vertebrate Evolution – Fall 2005, The Evergreen State College, Olympia, WA.
 
 Wesley-Hunt, Gina D. (2005) “The Morphological Diversification of Carnivores in North America.” Paleobiology. Vol. 31, Issue 1,  pp. 35–55.
 Benton, Michael J. and Philip C. J. Donoghue (2007) “Paleontological Evidence to Date the Tree of Life.”, Molecular Biology and Evolution, Volume 24, Issue 1, Pages 26–53
 
 Susumu Tomiya, Shawn P. Zack, Michelle Spaulding and John J. Flynn (2019.) "Carnivorous mammals from the Middle Eocene Washakie formation, Wyoming, U.S.A., and their diversity trajectory in a post-warming world", in ''"The Society of Vertebrate Paleontology 79th annual meeting"
 

 
Mammal unranked clades